The Cambridgeshire by-election was held on 16 March 1961.  The by-election was triggered by the appointment of the incumbent Conservative, Gerald Howard, as a High Court Judge on the Queen's Bench Division.  It was won by the Conservative candidate Francis Pym.

Candidates
The local Liberal association selected Richard Gillachrist Moore, a former journalist on the News Chronicle. He was born on 20 February 1931. He was a son of Sir Alan Hilary Moore and Hilda Mary Burrows. He was educated at Highfield School, Liphook and Radley College, Berkshire, gaining an exhibition to Trinity College, Cambridge in 1949. In 1955 he was President of Cambridge Union. He was also Chairman of the Union of University Liberal Societies. He was a member of the Liberal Party Council and the executive and the Colonial Affairs committee. He contested Tavistock at the general elections of 1955 and 1959.

Result

References

By-elections to the Parliament of the United Kingdom in Cambridgeshire constituencies
Cambridgeshire by-election
20th century in Cambridgeshire
Cambridgeshire by-election
Cambridgeshire by-election